Taulabé is a municipality in the Honduran department of Comayagua.

It is a very small town that is rapidly growing. The Caves of Taulabe are in the municipality. A guided tour of 400 meters of the caves is available. The caves have been explored up to 12 km, but the exact length of the caves has yet to be determined.

Municipalities of the Comayagua Department